Parliamentary elections were held in Cyprus in 1960. The House of Representatives was elected on 31 July 1960. The Communal Chambers were also elected on 7 August. In the House of Representatives 35 seats were elected by Greek Cypriots and 15 by Turkish Cypriots. The result was a victory for the Patriotic Front, which won 30 of the 50 seats. In the Communal Chambers, the Patriotic Front won the majority of seats in the Greek Chamber, whilst the Cyprus Turkish National Union won all seats in the Turkish Chamber.

Electoral system
The House of Representatives consisted of 35 Greek members and 15 Turkish members, whilst the Greek Communal Chamber had 26 members and the Turkish Communal Chamber had 30.

The 1959 electoral law divided Cyprus into six multi-member constituencies. Voters could vote for as many candidates as there were seats in their constituency. The electoral system used was Plurality voting.

Campaign
The Democratic Union led by Themistocles Dervis and Ioannis Clerides did not participate in the elections. The Democratic Union had opposed the 1959 electoral law, claiming it favoured the Patriotic Front.

The Patriotic Front and AKEL formed a pact for the elections, with a pre-agreed split of 30 and 5 seats respectively. 

The hastily formed Pancyprian Union of Fighters fielded four candidates, with two in Nicosia, one in Kyrenia and one in Larnaca.

The Patriotic Front and AKEL pressured independent candidates to withdraw from the elections. As a result, the only female candidate, Kallistheni Maouni (Limassol), withdrew her candidacy.

In Paphos, the three candidates of the Patriotic Front and one candidate of AKEL were elected unopposed.

In the fifteen Turkish seats, eight members of the Cyprus Turkish National Union, which was led by Vice-President Fazıl Küçük, ran unopposed in Nicosia, Kyrenia and Larnaca, whilst six independent candidates ran against the Cyprus Turkish National Union’s candidates in Famagusta, Limassol and Paphos.

The Patriotic Front and AKEL also formed an electoral pact for the Communal Chambers, with a pre-agreed split of 20 and 3 seats respectively. They reserved three seats for the Latin, Armenian and Maronite Communities, which had opted to join the Greek Community upon independence. 

For the 26 seats in the Greek Chamber 31 candidacies were submitted. In Larnaca the three candidates of the Patriotic Front and in Limassol the three candidates of the Patriotic front and one candidate of AKEL were elected unopposed. For the 30 seats of the Turkish Chamber 31 candidacies were submitted, 30 of which were members of the Cyprus Turkish National Union. The Cyprus Turkish National Union's 10, 6, 2, 4 and 4 candidates in Nicosia, Famagusta, Kyrenia, Larnaca and Paphos respectively were declared elected unopposed. 

The agreement reached by the Patriotic Front and AKEL also provided that the two parties would avoid the holding of elections, and independent candidates were pressured to withdraw. In Nicosia, independent candidate Christodoulos Pipis withdrew his candidacy and the six candidates of the Patriotic Front, one candidate of AKEL, Latin candidate Anthony Pietroni and Armenian candidate Berge Tilbian (who ran as a candidate for the Patriotic Front)  were declared elected unopposed. In Paphos, on 3 August independent candidate Efthivoulos Ieropoulos withdrew his candidacy and the two candidates of the Patriotic Front and one candidate of AKEL were declared elected unopposed. In Famagusta, on 6 August (one day before the elections) independent candidate Polyvios Mavrommatis withdrew his candidacy and the four candidates of the Patriotic Front were declared elected unopposed. 

Informal elections were held to decide the candidate for the Armenian community on 5 August. The winner of these elections would run as a candidate for the Patriotic Front in Nicosia and the other candidates would withdraw their candidacies. These were won by Berge Tilbian, and Vahram Levonian withdrew his candidacy.

In Kyrenia, independent candidate Savvas Christis refused to withdraw from the elections and ran against the three candidates of the Patriotic Front (including the Maronite candidate, Ioannis Mavrides).

In the Turkish Chamber, independent candidate Beukagi Kioproulou was pressured into withdrawing his candidacy in Limassol and the four candidates of the Cyprus Turkish National Union were declared elected unopposed. Therefore, no elections were held for the Turkish Chamber and the Cyprus Turkish National Union won all 30 seats.

Results

House of Representatives

By constituency

Greek Community

Turkish Community

Communal Chambers

By constituency

Aftermath
Following the elections, Glafcos Clerides was elected president of the House of Representatives and Orhan Muderisoglu was elected Vice-President, and a 12-member cabinet was formed.

 

By-elections were held shortly after the elections as four of the elected MPs, Fazil Plumber, Andreas Papadopoulos, Osman Örek and Niyazi Manyera were appointed ministers. 

On 21 July 1961 Patriotic Front MP Lefkios Rodosthenous was removed from the House of Representatives. His seat remained vacant for the rest of his term. 

In 1961 the Independent Turkish Group was created by eleven of the Turkish-Cypriot MPs. It was led by Orhan Muderisoglu. 

In 1962 MP Petros Stylianou left the Patriotic Front and continued as an Independent for the remainder of his term. 

In 1963 Turkish-Cypriot MP Shemshedin Halit Kazım died in a car accident. His seat was filled by his wife Ayla Halit Kazım. In December 1963 the Turkish Cypriots withdrew from participation in the government, leaving Parliament with only its Greek members.

On 21 April 1966 Patriotic Front MPs Titos Fanos and Georgios Tompazos were appointed ministers of agriculture and works respectively, and resigned from the House of Representatives. Their seats remained vacant for the rest of their respective terms. Another MP, Costas Christodoulides, left the Patriotic Front, and Daphnis Panayides, elected in the first by-elections, resigned from the House of Representatives in that same year. Panayides' seat also remained vacant.

References

1960 in Cyprus
Cyprus
Legislative elections in Cyprus
July 1960 events in Europe
August 1960 events in Europe